Events from the year 1648 in Spain

Incumbents
 Monarch – Philip IV

Events

 - Peace of Münster

Births

Deaths

References

 
1640s in Spain
Years of the 17th century in Spain